This article comprises four sortable tables of mountain summits of Mexico that are higher than any other point north or south of their latitude or east or west their longitude in Mexico.

The summit of a mountain or hill may be measured in three principal ways:
The topographic elevation of a summit measures the height of the summit above a geodetic sea level.
The topographic prominence of a summit is a measure of how high the summit rises above its surroundings.
The topographic isolation (or radius of dominance) of a summit measures how far the summit lies from its nearest point of equal elevation.



Northernmost high summits

Southernmost high summits

Easternmost high summits

Westernmost high summits

Gallery

See also

List of mountain peaks of North America
List of mountain peaks of Greenland
List of mountain peaks of Canada
List of mountain peaks of the Rocky Mountains
List of mountain peaks of the United States
List of mountain peaks of Mexico
List of the ultra-prominent summits of Mexico

List of mountain peaks of Central America
List of mountain peaks of the Caribbean
Mexico
Geography of Mexico
:Category:Mountains of Mexico
commons:Category:Mountains of Mexico
Physical geography
Topography
Topographic elevation
Topographic prominence
Topographic isolation

Notes

References

External links

Instituto Nacional de Estadística, Geografía e Informática (INEGI)
Sistemas Nacionales Estadístico y de Información Geográfica (SNEIG)
Bivouac.com
Peakbagger.com
Peaklist.org
Peakware.com
Summitpost.org

 
Lists of mountains of Mexico
Geography of Mexico